Ranunculus bonariensis is a species of buttercup known by the common name Carter's buttercup. There are three varieties. Two are native to Chile and Argentina, and one is found in central California in the United States.

References

External links
Jepson Manual Treatment: var. trisepalus

bonariensis
Flora of North America